

Arts and Science colleges 
 Dr. Zakir Hussain College, Sivagangai

Engineering colleges 
 Alagappa Chettiar College of Engineering and Technology, Karaikudi
 Annai Teresa College of Education, Ariyakudi
 Central Electro Chemical Research Institute, Karaikudi
 Vidhyaa Giri College of Arts and Science, Ariyakudi

Schools 
 Chittal Achi Memorial Schools, Karaikudi
 Shri Vidhyaa Giri Matric Higher Secondary School Puduvayal, Puduvayal Karaikudi
 Sri Sevuga Moorthy Matric School, Ariyakudi
 St. Michael Matric Higher Secondary School, Ariyakudi
 Vidhya Giri Matric Hr Sec Shoool Karaikudi, Karaikudi
 Mount Litera Zee School, Sivagangai

References 

Education in Sivaganga district
Sivaganga